Admiral Francis Erskine Loch (April 1788–13 February 1868) was a senior commander in the Royal Navy during the early 19th century. He served as naval aide-de-camp to Queen Victoria.

Life

He was born in April 1788 in Drylaw House north of Edinburgh (now within the city boundary) the son of George Loch (1749–1788) and his wife Mary Adam, daughter of John Adam of the Adam family of architects.

On 17 March 1800 Loch narrowly escaped death when the ship was destroyed by fire and blew up killing 673 men off the Italian coast near Leghorn. Loch was one of the few survivors. Loch served as a midshipman aboard ,  aad . He was present at the blockade of Genoa in May 1800 aboard Minotaur. Still with Lord Keith's fleet, he joined  under Captain John Stewart. He was placed on the island of Rhodes overseeing the equipping of gunboats bound for Egypt and Lake Mareotis early in 1801. He took part in the landings at Aboukir Bay and was among the party that cut out a Greek vessel from under the guns of the castle overlooking the bay. He then joined  and then  until November 1801 before transferring back to Foudroyant. He returned home in 1802.

From May 1803 to 1805 he served under his cousin, Captain Adam on the captured French frigate  in the North Sea and the English Channel. On Chiffonne he saw major action on 10 June 1805 when Chiffonne was among the Royal Navy vessels that drove two French corvettes and 15 gun-vessels ashore at Fecamp. The French warships had been escorting 14 transports. In January 1806 he was promoted to lieutenant on  under Rear Admiral Charles Stirling. He stayed with Queen Charlotte until his promotion to captain.

In the latter he served in the East Indies and Persian Gulf, acting as the senior officer for this zone.

He was invalided out of active service in the summer of 1839. From September 1839 to September 1841 he was commander of HMS Victory, not the famous ship, but a guard-ship placed at Portsmouth. In 1847 he was made naval aide-de-camp to Queen Victoria (a prestigious but non-active role). Loch then underwent several promotions, but without command: rear admiral (1850); vice admiral (1857); admiral (1860).

He retired to Edinburgh in 1860, living at 22 George Square as neighbour to Reverend Patrick Clason. He died in Cheltenham on 13 February 1868.

Family

Loch's had several important family connections: great grandfather- William Adam; great uncle – Robert Adam; uncle – William Adam of Blair Adam; cousin – Admiral Sir Charles Adam; nephew – Captain Granville Gower Loch RN

In 1822 he was married to Jesse Robertson in Edinburgh. Jesse was the daughter of Major Robertson, Barrack-Master-General of North Britain. Their known children were:

 George Francis Loch (1824–1848)
 Francis Adam Ellis Loch (1827–1891)
 Jane Garden Loch (1830–1891)
 Archibald Robertson Loch (1833–1906)
 James Henry Loch (1833–1918) his twin

Francis' children included Major General Granville George Loch (1870–1950)

Memorabilia

His diary and sketch-books are held at the National Archive in Kew.

References

1788 births
1868 deaths
Military personnel from Edinburgh
Royal Navy admirals
Royal Navy personnel of the Napoleonic Wars